The 2018 Tarleton State Texans football team represented Tarleton State University in the 2018 NCAA Division II football season. They were led by head coach Todd Whitten, who was in his third consecutive season at Tarleton State and ninth overall as the head coach of the program. The Texans played their home games at Memorial Stadium and were members of the Lone Star Conference. The Texans finished the regular season with an overall record of 10–0 record and mark of 8–0 in conference play, and winning the LSC championship.

Schedule
Tarleton State announced its 2018 football schedule on May 14, 2018. The schedule consisted of six home and five away games in the regular season.

The Texans hosted two of the three non-conference games against Delta State from the Gulf South Conference and Lincoln University but had an away game with Stephen F. Austin canceled.

Players drafted into the NFL

References

Tarleton State
Tarleton State Texans football seasons
Lone Star Conference football champion seasons
Tarleton State Texans football